The Ghana national rugby union team represents Ghana in international rugby union. Ghana are a member of the International Rugby Board (IRB), and  had not played in a Rugby World Cup tournament. Ghana played their first international game during the 2003 season, and defeated Mauritania by 29 points to 8. Since then there have been a number of youth teams in Ghana; the under-18 team won a junior rugby competition. The National Team itself has hosted a tournament and had some credible results on the field.

History
After forming in 2005, the Ghana National Rugby Union Team has played in a number of competitions. The team was founded by a coach from Cameroon named Guy Chaley who recruited players, including coach Amuzu Salim, to play their first international match. Support, but not funding, from the government was gained for the national team. Shortly after they were played in  their first African Tournament. This was followed by the death of Guy Chaley which stunted the success and growth of the team. Amuzu Salim was then able to train as a coach to train  the Ghana Under 18, 15 and 12 teams. Notable gap year helpers include Peter Dear who helped start the school program in Accra and surrounding areas; he donated kit. Since the first tournament, the team have been included in the Castel Beer Trophies which are development tournament for smaller rugby nations of Africa. The country reached the final of the 2009 Development Trophy in Togo.

Overall Record
Below is table of the representative rugby matches played by a Ghana's national XV at test level up until

See also
 Rugby union in Ghana
 CAR Castel Beer Trophy

External links
 Ghana on IRB.com
 Ghana on rugbydata.com
 Ghana rugby unofficial
 Official Website 
 

African national rugby union teams
Rugby union in Ghana
National sports teams of Ghana